Agnes Hedwig of Anhalt (12 March 1573, Dessau – 3 November 1616, Sønderborg) was a Princess of Anhalt by birth, an Abbess of Gernrode, and by marriage Electress of Saxony and later Duchess of Schleswig-Holstein-Sonderburg.

She was the daughter of Prince Joachim Ernest of Anhalt and his second wife Eleonore of Württemberg.  From 1581 to 1586 she was abbess of the Imperial Abbey of St. Cyriac in Gernrode.

On 3 January 1586, at the age of 13, she married Elector Augustus of Saxony, becoming his second wife. On their wedding night, she is said to have asked for the release of Caspar Peucer. Elector Augustus died a few weeks later, on 11 February 1586.  She received Lichtenburg Castle as her wittum, but never lived there.

Two years later, on 14 February 1588, she married Duke John II of Schleswig-Holstein-Sonderburg; she was his second wife, too.  She died in 1616, six years before her husband.

Issue 
From her second marriage, Agnes Hedwig had nine children:
 Eleonore (4 April 1590 – 13 April 1669)
 Anna Sabine (7 March 1593 – 18 July 1659), married on 1 January 1618 to Duke Julius Frederick of Württemberg-Weiltingen
 Johann Georg (9 February 1594 – 25 January 1613)
 Duke Joachim Ernst I of Schleswig-Holstein-Sønderborg-Plön (1622–71) (29 August 1595 – 5 October 1671)
 Dorothea Sibylle (13 July 1597 – 21 August 1597)
 Dorothea Marie (23 July 1599 – 27 March 1600)
 Bernhard (12 April 1601 – 26 April 1601)
 Agnes Magdalene (17 November 1602 – 17 May 1607)
 Eleonore Sofie (24 February 1603 – 5 January 1675), married on 28 February 1624 to Prince Christian II of Anhalt-Bernburg

Footnotes 

|-

Secular abbesses
Electresses of Saxony
German duchesses
1573 births
1616 deaths
16th-century German people
17th-century German people
Gernrode
⚭Agnes Hedwig of Anhalt
Daughters of monarchs
Remarried royal consorts